Monaco competed at the 1924 Summer Olympics held in Paris, France.

Julien Médecin won a bronze medal for architecture at the art competitions. However, the medals for art competition are not included in the official tally. Seven competitors, all men, took part in six events in four sports.

Athletics

A single athlete represented Monaco in 1924. It was the nation's second appearance in the sport as well as the Games.

Ranks given are within the heat.

Sailing

A single sailor represented Monaco in 1924. It was the nation's debut in the sport.

Shooting

Four sport shooters represented Monaco in 1924. It was the nation's debut in the sport.

References

External links
Official Olympic Reports
J.O. de Paris (in French)

Nations at the 1924 Summer Olympics
1924 Summer Olympics
Summer Olympics